Greatest Hits Radio South is a regional radio station serving the South of England, as part of Bauer’s Greatest Hits Radio network.

Coverage
The six local stations broadcast to Salisbury, Dorset, West Sussex, North Hampshire, Berkshire and Aylesbury from central studios in Manchester, Liverpool and London, and a regional studio in Segensworth, Fareham for opt-outs.

History
After acquiring several businesses in early 2019, in May 2020, Bauer Radio announced many of their radio stations would rebrand and join the Greatest Hits Radio network, including several stations in the south of England:

Eagle Radio in Guildford
Spire FM in Salisbury
Wessex FM in Dorchester
Mix 96 in Aylesbury
Spirit FM in Chichester
The Breeze in Andover, Newbury, Basingstoke and Reading, branded as Greatest Hits Radio Berkshire & North Hampshire

Programming
During the week most programming is shared with the Greatest Hits Radio network.  A regional three-hour afternoon show is broadcast from studios in Segensworth near Fareham by former Spire FM presenter Martin Starke.
Each localised area in the South has their own latest local news, weather and travel news updates.

Technical

References

External links
 Greatest Hits Radio

Bauer Radio
Greatest Hits Radio
Radio stations in the United Kingdom
2020 establishments in the United Kingdom
Radio stations established in 2020